Jayoti Vidyapeeth Women's University is the first State private public women's university in India. The state legislature of Rajasthan established the university through the Jayoti Vidyapeeth Women's University Act 2008 (Act No. 17 of 2008) under section 2(f)(12 b) of the UGC Act, 1956.

The university is associated with different corporate companies and organisation through its Consortium of University and Industries.
University is mobile restricted for all the students and teachers and having strict rules and regulations to maintain  disciplined environment.

Programs
The university presently offers more than 156 academic programs offered under various disciplines resulting in the awarding of various certificates, diplomas, bachelor's degrees, masters and doctoral degrees.

Resources
The university has more than 750 computers and subscriptions to various electronic journals.
 
The library has more than 100,000 books. 
The residential hostels have sports complexes, theaters, gyms and communal TV rooms.

Security
The University has a Security Cover for round the clock security. The university has a full-time security officer. Female guards are on duty for 24 hours to provide security within the hostels and male guards patrol all the gates of the campus.

References

External links

Women's universities and colleges in Jaipur
2008 establishments in Rajasthan
Educational institutions established in 2008